Ain Shams University, Faculty of Medicine or School of Medicine, is a public Egyptian graduate school and one of the faculties of Ain Shams University. Now, it is one of the largest educational medical institutions in Africa and the Middle East. It was founded in 1947, making it the third oldest medical school in Egypt.  It has promoted numerous programs of medical care to serve society, in addition to environmental development and continuous scientific research for local and international health.
It became part of Ain Shams University in the 1950s, when it was established after adding several faculty members. Each year the faculty holds an annual conference dedicated to the recent advances in medical science.

History 

The school of medicine was called el-Demerdash School of Medicine, before establishment of the university. The original El-Demerdash Hospital was established on August 5, 1928, by a generous grant from El-Demerdash Pasha and his wife and daughter. It was built on 12,400 square metres, and had 90 beds and the following sections: quarters for a resident physician and chief nurse, two wards, a surgery unit, out-patient clinic, a laboratory, kitchen, laundry room, isolation ward, an autopsy department and a mosque containing the mausoleum for the El-Demerdash family. The foundation of the hospital was witnessed by many people representing all the society of Egypt and also by the two most powerful figures in the country in that time: Lord George Lloyd (later on George Lloyd, 1st Baron Lloyd), the British high commissioner, and Prime Minister of Egypt Mohamed Mahmoud Pasha. The opening ceremony was covered by Al Ahram, The Times and the Near East journals. It was officially opened on May 5, 1931. A memorial metallic plate and a marble monument were erected to mark this event.

The translation of the metallic plate is: "The honourable late Pasha Abdel-Rahim Moustafa El-Demerdash (may he have all God's forgiveness) and the two ladies his wife Zainab Hanem El-Demerdashiah and his daughter Qout Alqoulob Hanem El-Demerdashiah have donated—on the 5th of August 1928—by the piece of land on which this Hospital was erected which is 15,000 meter square, and donated the sum of 100,000 Egyptian Royal Pounds to be divided as 40,000 for the building of the hospital and 60,000 to be put into a Waqf and its benefits are dedicated to the expenses of running the hospital."

Ain Shams University, as the third Egyptian university, was founded in July 1950 under the name of "Ibrahim Pasha University". It participated with the two earlier universities, "Cairo University" (Fua'd the 1st ) and "Alexandria University" (Farouk the 1st) in fulfilling the message of universities and meeting the increasing demand of youth for higher education. When it was first established, Ain Shams University comprised a number of distinguished faculties and academic institutes, which were later developed into university. After the revolution of July 23, 1952, it was suggested that Egyptian universities be given names that were strongly linked with the roots and historical landmarks of the country. Thus on February 21, 1954, the name of the university was changed to "Heliopolis", and then changed in the same year to its present name "Ain Shams"Ain Shams University

Location 
The faculty of medicine with its hospitals is located in Abbassyia district of Cairo governorate, on Ahmed Lotfy Al-Sayed street.

Campus 
The campus is located in Cairo, consists of three faculties and one institute, educational hospitals, outpatient clinics, administration, a library, scientific societies and some medical units.

Faculties and Institutes 
Faculty of Medicine
The Faculty of Medicine serves more than 6000 undergraduate students over the 6 years of undergraduate teaching, and more than 1500 post-graduate students (Diplomas, Master of Science in medicine & Medical Doctorate) in various academic and clinical departments. Not only one of the medical schools, but a free (not for profit) hospital serving more than one million patients annually. 

Faculty of Dentistry
In addition to the educational role, the Faculty of Dentistry provides dental community services.
Faculty of Nursing
Focuses on the diagnosis and treatment of human responses to actual or potential health problems.
Institute of Psychiatry
A group of faculty and staff dedicated to education and research in psychiatric care.

Buildings Located in The Ain Shams Medical District 
Which is located behind el-Nour mosque in Abbasyyia square in the heart of Cairo, Egypt

Ain Shams University Educational Hospital 
:Image:ASUH3.jpg

Pediatrics hospital 

Pediatric department- Faculty of Medicine- Ain Shams University

El-Demerdash hospital

Training & Education Enhancement Center

School hospitals

Educational Hospital
Faculty of Medicine Educational Hospital (internal medicine and surgery) consists of an outpatient clinic and inpatient department. Both have approximately 3200 beds (in 1997), with more than 10,000 staff working in all departments and serving about 2,000,000 patients from all over Egypt annually. It is managed by doctors who are professors of medicine and the other faculty staff in all specializations. The capital of the hospital was estimated to be 6 billion EGP in 1997.

Medical Centers and Outpatient Clinics
Institute of Psychiatry Hospital.
Poison Control Center
Radiation Oncology & Nuclear Medicine Center
Outpatient Clinics
Emergency Departments

Ain Shams University Specialized Hospital
Established in 1984 as a self sponsored unit to provide advanced medical care service not only egypt but all over the world.

The Cardiac Surgery Academy (CSA) 
CSA is an independent establishment, belongs to Ain Shams University, with a 400 bed capacity, most of them are surgical, also provides many free services.

Intensive care units 
Internal Medicine, Geriatrics, Surgical, Trauma & Surgical ER, Neurology, Department of Neurosurgery, Toxicology, Coronary, Pediatric Cardiology, Respiratory system, Burns, Cardiothoracic surgery, Pediatric surgery, Obstetrics & Gynecology, Pediatrics, Neonatal.

Departments 
The school comprises 10 Academic departments including Anatomy, Histology, Biochemistry, Physiology, Pharmacology, Pathology, Parasitology, Microbiology, Community Medicine (Community, Environmental & Occupational Medicine), Forensic and Toxicology. All of the 21 clinical departments are located in the university hospitals, including the 6 major Clinical departments (Ophthalmology, Ear, Nose and Throat (ENT), Internal medicine, Tropical medicine, Surgery, Obstetrics & Gynecology and Pediatrics).

Notable faculty graduates 
 Prof Ahmed Okasha, President of the Egyptian Psychiatric Association and President of World Psychiatric Association (WPA) from 2002 through 2005
 Prof Ahmed Samy Khalifa, pediatric hematologist who was given the National Encouragement Award in Medical Sciences in 1982, and the National Recognition Award in Advanced Technological Sciences in 1998.
 Prof Paul Ghalioungui, Egyptian-Greek internist and medical history writer (Arabic and Pharonic)

 Prof Abdel Moniem Ashour (1934-2015), psychogeriatrician, one of the founders of the International Psychogeriatrics Association (IPA), writer and founder of the Al-Zehimer Egypt Association.
 Prof Hamdy El-Sayed, head of Parliament's Health Committee and Chairman of the Egyptian Doctors' Syndicate
 Prof Mohammed Awad Tagg Eldin, respiratory disease professor and former Minister of Health
 Prof Maher Mahran, obstetrician, former Minister for Population and Family Welfare, and former Secretary General of the National Population Council of Egypt
 Prof Ismael Sallam, cardiothoracic surgeon and former Minister of Health and Population from 1996 until 2002, one of the nine candidates for the position of World Health Organization Director-General
 Prof Samy Azer, Professor of Medical Education focusing on Medical Education and Problem-Based Learning in Australia, Malaysia, Taiwan, Japan, and the USA *Biography. Who's Who in America.
Prof Yehia El-Gamal Professor of Pediatrics.
Prof Strauss El-Hauzer Kahn, Author of Believe in Better and leader of the Young Brother Movement 
Prof Mahmoud Hassan Maamoun former professor of Internal Medicine and head of the Internal Medicine Department. Discovered Mamoun's Sign, a preliminary Kidney cancer diagnosis.
Prof. Mamdouh Mohamed Salama, the first neurosurgery resident in Egypt  and the founder of the neurosurgery unit and department in the hospital and the faculty

References

External links 
Faculty of Medicine official web site
Extended Modular Program EMP – Ain Shams Faculty of Medicine 
Photos of the old school
Faculty of Dentistry official web site
Faculty of Nursing official web site
Institute of Psychiatry official web site.
Ain Shams University Specialized Hospital official web site
Cardiac Surgery Academy official web site
Ain Shams University official web site
ENT department
Cardiology department
Pancreatic Islets transplantation Unit
Ali Khalifa Diagnostic Oncology Unit
Tropical Medicine department
 Professor 
 http://www.digitalforsyth.org/photos/3431
 Ain Shams University

Ain Shams University
Medical schools in Egypt
Educational institutions established in 1928
Hospitals in Cairo
1928 establishments in Egypt